Candi Asu is part of the Sengi complex built in the 8th and 9th centuries. It is a Hindu temple lying in Magelang Regency, Central Java. It is nestled in between Mount Merapi and Mount Merbabu volcanoes and near the road from Mungkid to Boyolali.  

An external wall is formed as the base with an internal wall acting as the foundation.  Between the two walls, the area has been filled with two meters of rocks and earth, then paved on the top.  The remaining space was left for a center statue to be placed.  On the western outside wall, a masonry mass was left, forming the stairs.  From this rough layout, new lines were drawn in the paving in order to expand and build the temple properly.  Angular rocks were used as the original blocks, set at an angle.  The temple was nearing completion and larger rocks were to be placed last.  Carving began from the top of the temple, working downward.   The large finishing rocks that were to be used at the end were never carved or used, offering an explanation to their disappearance from the site.

See also

Candi of Indonesia
Hindu temple

References

Hindu temples in Indonesia
Religious buildings and structures in Central Java